Yuldybayevo (Yuldıbay) is a rural locality (a selo) and the administrative centre of Yuldybayevsky Selsoviet, Zilairsky District, Bashkortostan, Russia. The population was 1,650 as of 2010. There are 18 streets.

Geography 
Yuldybayevo is located 39 km northeast of Zilair (the district's administrative centre) by road. Maloyuldybayevo is the nearest rural locality.

References 

Rural localities in Zilairsky District